The Extraordinary is an Australian television documentary series that featured stories of the paranormal and supernatural. It ran on the Seven Network from 1993 to 1996. The following year it moved to the Nine Network.

History
The show was hosted by Warwick Moss, who would narrate to the audience "true life" tales of the paranormal. Stories on the show revolved around a wide variety of subjects including alien abduction, ghosts, tales of clairvoyance and cryptozoological creatures such as the yowie. The show had a distinct local slant, with stories on the 1987 Nullarbor UFO incident or the appearance of a headless ghost in a music video for the Australian band 1927.

The Extraordinary was one of very few Australian programs to crack the US Market. In the United States it ran as a syndicated program from 1994 until 1996, hosted by Corbin Bernsen.

Episodes
 Telly Savalas' ghost story, death pool aboriginal legend, soldier ghost photograph, killer whale conspiracy, blind psychic.

See also
List of Australian television series

External links
 

1990s Australian documentary television series
Paranormal television
1993 Australian television series debuts
1996 Australian television series endings
Seven Network original programming